Actuation may refer to:
High Redundancy Actuation (HRA), a new approach to fault tolerant control in the area of mechanical actuation
Variable valve actuation, any mechanism or method that can alter the shape or timing of a valve lift event within an internal combustion engine
Actuation, a type of self-realization referred to in Aristotle's philosophy of entelechy.

See also
 Actuator